Asterales  is an order of dicotyledonous flowering plants that includes the large family Asteraceae (or Compositae) known for composite flowers made of florets, and ten families related to the Asteraceae. The order has a cosmopolitan distribution, members are found throughout most of the world including desert and frigid zones, and includes mostly herbaceous species, although a small number of trees and shrubs are also present.

Asterales seem to have evolved from one common ancestor, and share characteristics on morphological and biochemical levels.  Synapomorphies (a character that is shared by two or more groups through evolutionary development) include the presence in the plants of oligosaccharide inulin, a nutrient storage molecule used instead of starch; and unique stamen morphology. The stamens are usually found around the style, either aggregated densely or fused into a tube, probably an adaptation in association with the plunger (brush; or secondary) pollination that is common among the families of the order, wherein pollen is collected and stored on the length of the pistil.

The anthophytes are a grouping of plant taxa bearing flower-like reproductive structures. They were formerly thought to be a clade comprising plants bearing flower-like structures.  The group contained the angiosperms - the extant flowering plants, such as roses and grasses - as well as the Gnetales and the extinct Bennettitales.

23,420 species of vascular plant have been recorded in South Africa, making it the sixth most species-rich country in the world and the most species-rich country on the African continent. Of these, 153 species are considered to be threatened. Nine biomes have been described in South Africa: Fynbos, Succulent Karoo, desert, Nama Karoo, grassland, savanna, Albany thickets, the Indian Ocean coastal belt, and forests.

The 2018 South African National Biodiversity Institute's National Biodiversity Assessment plant checklist lists 35,130 taxa in the phyla Anthocerotophyta (hornworts (6)), Anthophyta (flowering plants (33534)), Bryophyta (mosses (685)), Cycadophyta (cycads (42)), Lycopodiophyta (Lycophytes(45)), Marchantiophyta (liverworts (376)), Pinophyta (conifers (33)), and Pteridophyta (cryptogams (408)).

Five families are represented in the literature. Listed taxa include species, subspecies, varieties, and forms as recorded, some of which have subsequently been allocated to other taxa as synonyms, in which cases the accepted taxon is appended to the listing. Multiple entries under alternative names reflect taxonomic revision over time.

Asteraceae

Family: Asteraceae, 329 genera have been recorded. Not all are necessarily currently accepted. 

Genus Acanthospermum:
Genus Acanthotheca:
Genus Achillea:
Genus Achyrocline:
Genus Acmella:
Genus Adenachaena:
Genus Adenanthellum:
Genus Adenoglossa:
Genus Adenostemma:
Genus Afroaster:
Genus Ageratina:
Genus Ageratum:
Genus Alatoseta:
Genus Alciope:
Genus Ambrosia:
Genus Amellus:
Genus Amphiglossa:
Genus Anaglypha:
Genus Anaxeton:
Genus Anderbergia:
Genus Anisochaeta:
Genus Anisopappus:
Genus Anisothrix:
Genus Anthemis:
Genus Antithrixia:
Genus Aphelexis:
Genus Arctotheca:
Genus Arctotis:
Genus Argyrocome:
Genus Arnica:
Genus Arrowsmithia:
Genus Artemisia:
Genus Artemisiopsis:
Genus Ascaricida:
Genus Aspilia:
Genus Aster:
Genus Athanasia:
Genus Athrixia:
Genus Atractylis:
Genus Atrichantha:
Genus Baccharis:
Genus Baccharoides:
Genus Berkheya:
Genus Bertilia:
Genus Bidens:
Genus Blainvillea:
Genus Blumea:
Genus Bolandia:
Genus Bothriocline:
Genus Brachylaena:
Genus Brachymeris:
Genus Brachyrhynchos:
Genus Bryomorphe:
Genus Cacalia:
Genus Cadiscus:
Genus Calendula:
Genus Callilepis:
Genus Calostephane:
Genus Calotesta:
Genus Campuloclinium:
Genus Candidea:
Genus Capelio:
Genus Caputia:
Genus Carduus:
Genus Carthamus:
Genus Castalis:
Genus Cenia:
Genus Centaurea:
Genus Centipeda:
Genus Centrapalus:
Genus Chondrilla:
Genus Chromolaena:
Genus Chrysanthellum:
Genus Chrysanthemoides:
Genus Chrysanthemum:
Genus Chrysocoma:
Genus Cineraria:
Genus Cirsium:
Genus Cnicus:
Genus Comborhiza:
Genus Conyza:
Genus Corymbium:
Genus Cosmos:
Genus Cotula:
Genus Crassocephalum:
Genus Crassothonna:
Genus Crepis:
Genus Callumia:
Genus Curio:
Genus Cuspidia:
Genus Cyanthillium:
Genus Cymbopappus:
Genus Cypselodontia:
Genus Decaneurum:
Genus Delairea:
Genus Denekia:
Genus Dicerothamnus:
Genus Dichrocephala:
Genus Dicoma:
Genus Didelta:
Genus Dimorphanthes:
Genus Dimorphotheca:
Genus Disparago:
Genus Distephanus:
Genus Dittrichia:
Genus Doellia:
Genus Dolichothrix:
Genus Doria:
Genus Doronicum:
Genus Dymondia:
Genus Eclipta:
Genus Edmondia:
Genus Elephantopus:
Genus Elytropappus:
Genus Emilia:
Genus Enydra:
Genus Erigeron:
Genus Eriocephalus:
Genus Erlangia:
Genus Eschenbachia:
Genus Ethulia:
Genus Eumorphia:
Genus Eupatorium:
Genus Euryops:
Genus Facelis:
Genus Felicia:
Genus Flaveria:
Genus Foveolina:
Genus Gaillardia:
Genus Galeomma:
Genus Galinsoga:
Genus Gamochaeta:
Genus Garuleum:
Genus Gazania:
Genus Geigeria:
Genus Gerbera:
Genus Gibbaria:
Genus Glebionis:
Genus Gnaphalium:
Genus Gongrothamnus:
Genus Gongyloglossa:
Genus Gorteria:
Genus Grangea:
Genus Guizotia:
Genus Gymnanthemum:
Genus Gymnodiscus:
Genus Gymnopentzia:
Genus Gymnostephium:
Genus Haplocarpha:
Genus Hedypnois:
Genus Helianthus:
Genus Helichrysopsis:
Genus Helichrysum:
Genus Helminthotheca:
Genus Hertia:
Genus Heterolepis:
Genus Heteromma:
Genus Heterorhachis:
Genus Hilliardia:
Genus Hilliardiella:
Genus Hippia:
Genus Hirpicium:
Genus Hoplophyllum:
Genus Hydroidea:
Genus Hymenolepis:
Genus Hyoseris:
Genus Hypericophyllum:
Genus Hypochaeris:
Genus Ifloga:
Genus Inezia:
Genus Inula:
Genus Inulanthera:
Genus Inuloides:
Genus Iocaste:
Genus Keringa:
Genus Kleinia:
Genus Klenzea:
Genus Lachnospermum:
Genus Lactuca:
Genus Laevicarpa:
Genus Laggera:
Genus Lamprocephalus:
Genus Langebergia:
Genus Lapsana:
Genus Lasiopogon:
Genus Lasiopus:
Genus Lasiospermum:
Genus Launaea:
Genus Lepidostephium:
Genus Leptilon:
Genus Leucanthemum:
Genus Leucoptera:
Genus Leysera:
Genus Lidbeckia:
Genus Linzia:
Genus Litogyne:
Genus Lopholaena:
Genus Macledium:
Genus Macowania:
Genus Mairia:
Genus Mantisalca:
Genus Marasmodes:
Genus Marsea:
Genus Matricaria:
Genus Melanthera:
Genus Mesogramma:
Genus Metalasia:
Genus Microglossa:
Genus Mikania:
Genus Mikaniopsis:
Genus Minurothamnus:
Genus Monoculus:
Genus Montanoa:
Genus Monticapra:
Genus Morysia:
Genus Myrovernix:
Genus Myxopappus:
Genus Namibithamnus:
Genus Nephrotheca:
Genus Nestlera:
Genus Nicolasia:
Genus Nidorella:
Genus Nolletia:
Genus Norlindhia:
Genus Oedera:
Genus Oldenburgia:
Genus Oligocarpus:
Genus Oligoglossa:
Genus Oligothrix:
Genus Oncosiphon:
Genus Oocephala:
Genus Orbivestus:
Genus Oreoleysera:
Genus Oresbia:
Genus Osmitopsis:
Genus Osteospermum:
Genus Othonna:
Genus Oxylaena:
Genus Parapolydora:
Genus Parthenium:
Genus Pechuel-loeschea:
Genus Pegolettia:
Genus Pentanema:
Genus Pentatrichia:
Genus Pentzia:
Genus Perdicium:
Genus Petalacte:
Genus Peyrousea:
Genus Phaenocoma:
Genus Phaneroglossa:
Genus Philyrophyllum:
Genus Phymaspermum:
Genus Picris:
Genus Planea:
Genus Platycarpha:
Genus Platycarphella:
Genus Plecostachys:
Genus Plectreca:
Genus Pluchea:
Genus Poecilolepis:
Genus Polyarrhena:
Genus Polydora:
Genus Printzia:
Genus Pseudoconyza:
Genus Pseudognaphalium:
Genus Pseudopegolettia:
Genus Psiadia:
Genus Pteronia:
Genus Pterothrix:
Genus Pulicaria:
Genus Relhania:
Genus Rennera:
Genus Rhynchopsidium:
Genus Roldana:
Genus Roodebergia:
Genus Rosenia:
Genus Schistostephium:
Genus Schkuhria:
Genus Senecio:
Genus Seneciodes:
Genus Seriphium:
Genus Sigesbeckia:
Genus Silybum:
Genus Solanecio:
Genus Solidago:
Genus Soliva:
Genus Sonchus:
Genus Sphaeranthus:
Genus Sphagneticola:
Genus Spilanthes:
Genus Staehelina:
Genus Steirodiscus:
Genus Stengelia:
Genus Stilpnogyne:
Genus Stoebe:
Genus Stomatanthes:
Genus Symphyotrichum:
Genus Syncarpha:
Genus Tagetes:
Genus Tanacetum:
Genus Taraxacum:
Genus Tarchonanthus:
Genus Tenrhynea:
Genus Thaminophyllum:
Genus Tithonia:
Genus Tolpis:
Genus Tragopogon:
Genus Trichogyne:
Genus Tridax:
Genus Tripteris:
Genus Troglophyton:
Genus Urospermum:
Genus Ursinia:
Genus Vellereophyton:
Genus Verbesina:
Genus Vernonella:
Genus Vernonia:
Genus Vernoniastrum:
Genus Vicoa:
Genus Waitzia:
Genus Webbia:
Genus Wedelia:
Genus Xanthium:
Genus Xenismia:
Genus Xeranthemum:
Genus Youngia:
Genus Zinnia:
Genus Zoutpansbergia:
Genus Zyrphelis:

Campanulaceae
Family: Campanulaceae,

Campanula
Genus Campanula:
 Campanula cinerea L.f. accepted as Wahlenbergia cinerea (L.f.) Lammers, indigenous
 Campanula fasciculata L.f. accepted as Wahlenbergia desmantha Lammers, endemic
 Campanula sessiliflora L.f. accepted as Wahlenbergia subulata (L'Her.) Lammers var. subulata, indigenous
 Campanula tenella L.f. accepted as Wahlenbergia tenella (L.f.) Lammers var. tenella, indigenous
 Campanula unidentata L.f. accepted as Wahlenbergia unidentata (L.f.) Lammers, endemic

Craterocapsa
Genus Craterocapsa:
 Craterocapsa alfredica D.Y.Hong, endemic
 Craterocapsa congesta Hilliard & B.L.Burtt, indigenous
 Craterocapsa insizwae (Zahlbr.) Hilliard & B.L.Burtt, endemic
 Craterocapsa montana (A.DC.) Hilliard & B.L.Burtt, indigenous
 Craterocapsa tarsodes Hilliard & B.L.Burtt, indigenous

Lightfootia
Genus Lightfootia:
 Lightfootia adpressa (Thunb.) A.DC. accepted as Wahlenbergia adpressa (Thunb.) Sond. present
 Lightfootia albens Spreng. ex A.DC. accepted as Wahlenbergia albens (Spreng. ex A.DC.) Lammers, indigenous
 Lightfootia albicaulis Sond. accepted as Wahlenbergia albicaulis (Sond.) Lammers, endemic
 Lightfootia asparagoides Adamson, accepted as Wahlenbergia asparagoides (Adamson) Lammers, endemic
 Lightfootia axillaris Sond. accepted as Wahlenbergia axillaris (Sond.) Lammers, endemic
 Lightfootia brachiata Adamson, accepted as Wahlenbergia brachiata (Adamson) Lammers, endemic
 Lightfootia brachyphylla Adamson, accepted as Wahlenbergia brachyphylla (Adamson) Lammers, endemic
 Lightfootia calcarea Adamson, accepted as Wahlenbergia calcarea (Adamson) Lammers, endemic
 Lightfootia caledonica Sond. accepted as Wahlenbergia dieterlenii (E.Phillips) Lammers, indigenous
 Lightfootia capillaris H.Buek, accepted as Wahlenbergia thulinii Lammers, endemic
 Lightfootia cinerea (L.f.) Sond. accepted as Wahlenbergia cinerea (L.f.) Lammers, endemic
 Lightfootia cordata Adamson, accepted as Wahlenbergia cordata (Adamson) Lammers, endemic
 Lightfootia denticulata (Burch.) Sond. var. transvaalensis Adamson, accepted as Wahlenbergia denticulata (Burch.) A.DC. var. transvaalensis (Adamson) W.G.Welman, indigenous
 Lightfootia dieterlenii E.Phillips, accepted as Wahlenbergia dieterlenii (E.Phillips) Lammers, indigenous
 Lightfootia diffusa H.Buek, accepted as Wahlenbergia tenella (L.f.) Lammers, indigenous
 Lightfootia diffusa H.Buek var. palustris Adamson, accepted as Wahlenbergia tenella (L.f.) Lammers var. palustris (Adamson) W.G.Welman, endemic
 Lightfootia diffusa H.Buek var. stokoei Adamson, accepted as Wahlenbergia tenella (L.f.) Lammers var. stokoei (Adamson) W.G.Welman, endemic
 Lightfootia dinteri Engl. ex Dinter, accepted as Wahlenbergia denticulata (Burch.) A.DC. var. denticulata
 Lightfootia divaricata H.Buek, accepted as Wahlenbergia thunbergii (Schult.) B.Nord. var. thunbergii, indigenous
 Lightfootia divaricata H.Buek var. debilis (Sond.) Adamson, accepted as Wahlenbergia thunbergii (Schult.) B.Nord. var. debilis (Sond.) B.Nord. endemic
 Lightfootia divaricata H.Buek var. filifolia Adamson, accepted as Wahlenbergia thunbergii (Schult.) B.Nord. var. filifolia (Adamson) B.Nord. endemic
 Lightfootia effusa Adamson, accepted as Wahlenbergia effusa (Adamson) Lammers, endemic
 Lightfootia fasciculata (L.f.) A.DC. accepted as Wahlenbergia desmantha Lammers, endemic
 Lightfootia intermedia H.Buek, accepted as Wahlenbergia thunbergii (Schult.) B.Nord. var. thunbergii, indigenous
 Lightfootia juncea (H.Buek) Sond. accepted as Wahlenbergia juncea (H.Buek) Lammers, endemic
 Lightfootia laxiflora Sond. accepted as Wahlenbergia laxiflora (Sond.) Lammers, endemic
 Lightfootia loddigesii A.DC. accepted as Wahlenbergia tenerrima (H.Buek) Lammers, indigenous
 Lightfootia longifolia A.DC. accepted as Wahlenbergia longifolia (A.DC.) Lammers, endemic
 Lightfootia longifolia A.DC. var. corymbosa Adamson, accepted as Wahlenbergia longifolia (A.DC.) Lammers var. corymbosa (Adamson) W.G.Welman, endemic
 Lightfootia macrostachys A.DC. accepted as Wahlenbergia macrostachys (A.DC.) Lammers, endemic
 Lightfootia microphylla Adamson, accepted as Wahlenbergia microphylla (Adamson) Lammers, endemic
 Lightfootia multicaulis Adamson, accepted as Wahlenbergia adamsonii Lammers, endemic
 Lightfootia multiflora Adamson, accepted as Wahlenbergia polyantha Lammers, endemic
 Lightfootia namaquana Sond. accepted as Wahlenbergia sonderi Lammers, endemic
 Lightfootia nodosa H.Buek, accepted as Wahlenbergia nodosa (H.Buek) Lammers, endemic
 Lightfootia oppositifolia A.DC. accepted as Wahlenbergia thulinii Lammers, indigenous
 Lightfootia paniculata Sond. accepted as Wahlenbergia magaliesbergensis Lammers, endemic
 Lightfootia parvifolia (P.J.Bergius) Adamson, accepted as Wahlenbergia parvifolia (P.J.Bergius) Lammers, endemic
 Lightfootia pauciflora Adamson, accepted as Wahlenbergia oligantha Lammers, endemic
 Lightfootia planifolia Adamson, accepted as Wahlenbergia riversdalensis Lammers, endemic
 Lightfootia rigida Adamson, accepted as Wahlenbergia neorigida Lammers, endemic
 Lightfootia rubens H.Buek, accepted as Wahlenbergia rubens (H.Buek) Lammers, endemic
 Lightfootia rubens H.Buek var. brachyphylla Adamson, accepted as Wahlenbergia rubens (H.Buek) Lammers var. brachyphylla (Adamson) W.G.Welman, endemic
 Lightfootia rubioides Banks ex A.DC. accepted as Wahlenbergia rubioides (Banks ex A.DC.) Lammers, endemic
 Lightfootia rubioides Banks ex A.DC. var. stokoei Adamson, accepted as Wahlenbergia rubioides (Banks ex A.DC.) Lammers var. stokoei (Adamson) W.G.Welman, endemic
 Lightfootia sessiliflora (L.f.) Sond. accepted as Wahlenbergia subulata (L'Her.) Lammers var. subulata, indigenous
 Lightfootia spicata H.Buek, accepted as Wahlenbergia macrostachys (A.DC.) Lammers, indigenous
 Lightfootia squarrosa Adamson, accepted as Wahlenbergia levynsiae Lammers, endemic
 Lightfootia stricta Adamson, accepted as Wahlenbergia neostricta Lammers, endemic
 Lightfootia subulata L'Her. accepted as Wahlenbergia subulata (L'Her.) Lammers, endemic
 Lightfootia subulata L'Her. var. congesta Adamson, accepted as Wahlenbergia subulata (L'Her.) Lammers var. congesta (Adamson) W.G.Welman, endemic
 Lightfootia subulata L'Her. var. tenuifolia Adamson, accepted as Wahlenbergia subulata (L'Her.) Lammers var. tenuifolia (Adamson) W.G.Welman, endemic
 Lightfootia tenella (L.f.) A.DC. accepted as Wahlenbergia tenella (L.f.) Lammers var. tenella, indigenous
 Lightfootia tenella (L.f.) A.DC. var. fasciculata (L.f.) Sond. accepted as Wahlenbergia desmantha Lammers, endemic
 Lightfootia tenella (L.f.) A.DC. var. microphylla Sond. accepted as Wahlenbergia nodosa (H.Buek) Lammers, indigenous
 Lightfootia tenella (L.f.) A.DC. var. tenerrima (H.Buek) Sond. accepted as Wahlenbergia tenerrima (H.Buek) Lammers var. tenerrima, indigenous
 Lightfootia tenella Lodd. accepted as Wahlenbergia tenerrima (H.Buek) Lammers, indigenous
 Lightfootia tenella Lodd. var. montana Adamson, accepted as Wahlenbergia tenerrima (H.Buek) Lammers var. montana (Adamson) W.G.Welman, endemic
 Lightfootia tenerrima H.Buek, accepted as Wahlenbergia tenerrima (H.Buek) Lammers var. tenerrima, endemic
 Lightfootia tenuis Adamson, accepted as Wahlenbergia pyrophila Lammers, endemic
 Lightfootia thunbergiana H.Buek, accepted as Wahlenbergia thunbergiana (H.Buek) Lammers, present
 Lightfootia uitenhagensis H.Buek, accepted as Wahlenbergia thunbergii (Schult.) B.Nord. var. thunbergii, indigenous
 Lightfootia umbellata Adamson, accepted as Wahlenbergia umbellata (Adamson) Lammers, endemic
 Lightfootia unidentata (L.f.) A.DC. accepted as Wahlenbergia unidentata (L.f.) Lammers, endemic

Merciera
Genus Merciera:
 Merciera azurea Schltr. endemic
 Merciera brevifolia A.DC. endemic
 Merciera eckloniana H.Buek, endemic
 Merciera leptoloba A.DC. endemic
 Merciera tenuifolia (L.f.) A.DC. endemic
 Merciera tenuifolia (L.f.) A.DC. var. azurea (Schltr.) Adamson, accepted as Merciera azurea Schltr. present
 Merciera tenuifolia (L.f.) A.DC. var. candolleana Sond. accepted as Merciera tenuifolia (L.f.) A.DC. present
 Merciera tetraloba Cupido, endemic
 Merciera vaginata Adamson, accepted as Carpacoce heteromorpha (H.Buek) L.Bolus, present

Microcodon
Genus Microcodon:
 Microcodon glomeratus A.DC. endemic
 Microcodon hispidulus (Thunb.) Sond. accepted as Wahlenbergia hispidula (Thunb.) A.DC.
 Microcodon linearis (L.f.) H.Buek, endemic
 Microcodon sparsiflorus A.DC. endemic

Prismatocarpus
Genus Prismatocarpus:
 Prismatocarpus alpinus (Bond) Adamson, endemic
 Prismatocarpus altiflorus L'Her. endemic
 Prismatocarpus brevilobus A.DC. endemic
 Prismatocarpus campanuloides (L.f.) Sond. indigenous
 Prismatocarpus campanuloides (L.f.) Sond. var. campanuloides, endemic
 Prismatocarpus campanuloides (L.f.) Sond. var. dentatus Adamson, endemic
 Prismatocarpus candolleanus Cham. endemic
 Prismatocarpus cliffortioides Adamson, endemic
 Prismatocarpus cordifolius Adamson, endemic
 Prismatocarpus crispus L'Her. endemic
 Prismatocarpus debilis Adamson, indigenous
 Prismatocarpus debilis Adamson var. debilis, endemic
 Prismatocarpus debilis Adamson var. elongatus Adamson, endemic
 Prismatocarpus decurrens Adamson, endemic
 Prismatocarpus diffusus (L.f.) A.DC. endemic
 Prismatocarpus fastigiatus C.Presl ex A.DC. endemic
 Prismatocarpus fruticosus L'Her. endemic
 Prismatocarpus hildebrandtii Vatke, endemic
 Prismatocarpus hispidus Adamson, endemic
 Prismatocarpus implicatus Adamson, endemic
 Prismatocarpus junceus H.Buek, accepted as Wahlenbergia juncea (H.Buek) Lammers
 Prismatocarpus lasiophyllus Adamson, endemic
 Prismatocarpus lycioides Adamson, endemic
 Prismatocarpus lycopodioides A.DC. indigenous
 Prismatocarpus lycopodioides A.DC. var. hispidus Adamson, endemic
 Prismatocarpus lycopodioides A.DC. var. lycopodioides, endemic
 Prismatocarpus nitidus L'Her. indigenous
 Prismatocarpus nitidus L'Her. var. nitidus, endemic
 Prismatocarpus nitidus L'Her. var. ovatus Adamson, accepted as Prismatocarpus debilis Adamson var. debilis, present
 Prismatocarpus pauciflorus Adamson, endemic
 Prismatocarpus pedunculatus (P.J.Bergius) A.DC. endemic
 Prismatocarpus pilosus Adamson, endemic
 Prismatocarpus rogersii Fourc. endemic
 Prismatocarpus schlechteri Adamson, endemic
 Prismatocarpus sessilis Eckl. ex A.DC. indigenous
 Prismatocarpus sessilis Eckl. ex A.DC. var. macrocarpus Adamson, endemic
 Prismatocarpus sessilis Eckl. ex A.DC. var. sessilis, endemic
 Prismatocarpus spinosus Adamson, endemic
 Prismatocarpus tenellus Oliv. endemic
 Prismatocarpus tenerrimus H.Buek, endemic
 Prismatocarpus virgatus Fourc. endemic

Rhigiophyllum
Genus Rhigiophyllum:
 Rhigiophyllum squarrosum Hochst. endemic

Roella
Genus Roella:
 Roella amplexicaulis Wolley-Dod, endemic
 Roella arenaria Schltr. endemic
 Roella bryoides H.Buek, endemic
 Roella ciliata L. endemic
 Roella compacta Schltr. endemic
 Roella cuspidata Adamson var. cuspidata, accepted as Roella compacta Schltr. present
 Roella cuspidata Adamson var. hispida Adamson, accepted as Roella compacta Schltr. present
 Roella decurrens L'Her. endemic
 Roella divina Cupido, endemic
 Roella dregeana A.DC. indigenous
 Roella dregeana A.DC. var. dregeana, endemic
 Roella dregeana A.DC. var. nitida (Schltr.) Adamson, endemic
 Roella dunantii A.DC. endemic
 Roella glomerata A.DC. endemic
 Roella goodiana Adamson, endemic
 Roella incurva A.DC. endemic
 Roella incurva A.DC. var. rigida Adamson, accepted as Roella prostrata E.Mey. ex A.DC. present
 Roella latiloba A.DC. endemic
 Roella lightfootioides Schltr. accepted as Roella spicata L.f. var. spicata, present
 Roella maculata Adamson, endemic
 Roella muscosa L.f. endemic
 Roella prostrata E.Mey. ex A.DC. endemic
 Roella psammophila Schltr. accepted as Roella dregeana A.DC. var. dregeana, present
 Roella recurvata A.DC. endemic
 Roella reticulata L. accepted as Cullumia reticulata (L.) Greuter, M.V.Agab. & Wagenitz, indigenous
 Roella rhodantha Adamson, accepted as Roella incurva A.DC. present
 Roella secunda H.Buek, endemic
 Roella spicata L.f. indigenous
 Roella spicata L.f. var. burchellii Adamson, endemic
 Roella spicata L.f. var. spicata, endemic
 Roella squarrosa P.J.Bergius, endemic
 Roella triflora (R.D.Good) Adamson, endemic
 Roella uncinata Cupido, endemic

Siphocodon
Genus Siphocodon:
 Siphocodon debilis Schltr. endemic
 Siphocodon spartioides Turcz. endemic

Theilera
Genus Theilera:
 Theilera capensis D.Y.Hong, accepted as Theilera robusta (A.DC.) Cupido, indigenous
 Theilera guthriei (L.Bolus) E.Phillips, endemic
 Theilera robusta (A.DC.) Cupido, endemic

Trachelium
Genus Trachelium:
 Trachelium lanceolatum Guss. not indigenous, cultivated

Treichelia
Genus Treichelia:
 Treichelia dodii Cupido, indigenous
 Treichelia longibracteata (H.Buek ex Eckl. & Zeyh.) Vatke, endemic

Wahlenbergia
Genus Wahlenbergia:
 Wahlenbergia abyssinica (Hochst. ex A.Rich.) Thulin, indigenous
 Wahlenbergia abyssinica (Hochst. ex A.Rich.) Thulin subsp. abyssinica, indigenous
 Wahlenbergia acaulis E.Mey. endemic
 Wahlenbergia acicularis Brehmer, endemic
 Wahlenbergia acuminata Brehmer, endemic
 Wahlenbergia adamsonii Lammers, endemic
 Wahlenbergia adpressa (Thunb.) Sond. endemic
 Wahlenbergia albens (Spreng. ex A.DC.) Lammers, indigenous
 Wahlenbergia albicaulis (Sond.) Lammers, endemic
 Wahlenbergia androsacea A.DC. indigenous
 Wahlenbergia annularis A.DC. indigenous
 Wahlenbergia annuliformis Brehmer, accepted as Wahlenbergia androsacea A.DC. endemic
 Wahlenbergia appressifolia Hilliard & B.L.Burtt, indigenous
 Wahlenbergia asparagoides (Adamson) Lammers, endemic
 Wahlenbergia asperifolia Brehmer, endemic
 Wahlenbergia axillaris (Sond.) Lammers, endemic
 Wahlenbergia banksiana A.DC. indigenous
 Wahlenbergia bolusiana Schltr. & Brehmer, endemic
 Wahlenbergia bowkerae Sond. endemic
 Wahlenbergia brachiata (Adamson) Lammers, endemic
 Wahlenbergia brachycarpa Schltr. endemic
 Wahlenbergia brachyphylla (Adamson) Lammers, endemic
 Wahlenbergia brehmeri Lammers, endemic
 Wahlenbergia brevisquamifolia Brehmer, endemic
 Wahlenbergia buseriana Schltr. & Brehmer, endemic
 Wahlenbergia calcarea (Adamson) Lammers, endemic
 Wahlenbergia campanuloides (Delile) Vatke, indigenous
 Wahlenbergia capensis (L.) A.DC. endemic
 Wahlenbergia capillacea (L.f.) A.DC. indigenous
 Wahlenbergia capillacea (L.f.) A.DC. subsp. capillacea, indigenous
 Wahlenbergia capillaris (H.Buek) Lammers, accepted as Wahlenbergia thulinii Lammers, endemic
 Wahlenbergia capillata Brehmer, endemic
 Wahlenbergia capillifolia E.Mey. ex Brehmer, endemic
 Wahlenbergia cernua (Thunb.) A.DC. endemic
 Wahlenbergia ciliolata A.DC. accepted as Wahlenbergia cernua (Thunb.) A.DC. present
 Wahlenbergia cinerea (L.f.) Lammers, endemic
 Wahlenbergia clavata Brehmer, endemic
 Wahlenbergia clavatula Brehmer, endemic
 Wahlenbergia compacta Brehmer, endemic
 Wahlenbergia congestifolia Brehmer, indigenous
 Wahlenbergia constricta Brehmer, endemic
 Wahlenbergia cooperi Brehmer, indigenous
 Wahlenbergia cordata (Adamson) Lammers, endemic
 Wahlenbergia costata A.DC. endemic
 Wahlenbergia cuspidata Brehmer, endemic
 Wahlenbergia debilis H.Buek, endemic
 Wahlenbergia decipiens A.DC. endemic
 Wahlenbergia dentata Brehmer, endemic
 Wahlenbergia denticulata (Burch.) A.DC. indigenous
 Wahlenbergia denticulata (Burch.) A.DC. var. denticulata, indigenous
 Wahlenbergia denticulata (Burch.) A.DC. var. transvaalensis (Adamson) W.G.Welman, endemic
 Wahlenbergia denudata A.DC. endemic
 Wahlenbergia depressa J.M.Wood & M.S.Evans, indigenous
 Wahlenbergia desmantha Lammers, endemic
 Wahlenbergia dichotoma A.DC. endemic
 Wahlenbergia dieterlenii (E.Phillips) Lammers, indigenous
 Wahlenbergia dilatata Brehmer, endemic
 Wahlenbergia distincta Brehmer, endemic
 Wahlenbergia divergens A.DC. endemic
 Wahlenbergia doleritica Hilliard & B.L.Burtt, endemic
 Wahlenbergia dunantii A.DC. endemic
 Wahlenbergia ecklonii H.Buek, endemic
 Wahlenbergia effusa (Adamson) Lammers, endemic
 Wahlenbergia epacridea Sond. indigenous
 Wahlenbergia exilis A.DC. endemic
 Wahlenbergia fasciculata Brehmer, indigenous
 Wahlenbergia filipes Brehmer, endemic
 Wahlenbergia fistulosa Brehmer, endemic
 Wahlenbergia floribunda Schltr. & Brehmer, endemic
 Wahlenbergia fruticosa Brehmer, endemic
 Wahlenbergia galpiniae Schltr. endemic
 Wahlenbergia glandulifera Brehmer, endemic
 Wahlenbergia glandulosa Brehmer, accepted as Wahlenbergia androsacea A.DC. present
 Wahlenbergia gracilis E.Mey. endemic
 Wahlenbergia grandiflora Brehmer, indigenous
 Wahlenbergia hispidula (Thunb.) A.DC. endemic
 Wahlenbergia huttonii (Sond.) Thulin, indigenous
 Wahlenbergia ingrata A.DC. endemic
 Wahlenbergia inhambanensis Klotzsch, accepted as Wahlenbergia androsacea A.DC. present
 Wahlenbergia juncea (H.Buek) Lammers, endemic
 Wahlenbergia kowiensis R.A.Dyer, endemic
 Wahlenbergia krebsii Cham. indigenous
 Wahlenbergia krebsii Cham. subsp. krebsii, indigenous
 Wahlenbergia lasiocarpa Schltr. & Brehmer, endemic
 Wahlenbergia laxiflora (Sond.) Lammers, endemic
 Wahlenbergia levynsiae Lammers, endemic
 Wahlenbergia littoralis Schltr. & Brehmer, accepted as Wahlenbergia orae Lammers, present
 Wahlenbergia lobata Brehmer, endemic
 Wahlenbergia lobulata Brehmer, indigenous
 Wahlenbergia longifolia (A.DC.) Lammers, endemic
 Wahlenbergia longifolia (A.DC.) Lammers var. corymbosa (Adamson) W.G.Welman, endemic
 Wahlenbergia longifolia (A.DC.) Lammers var. longifolia, endemic
 Wahlenbergia longisepala Brehmer, endemic
 Wahlenbergia longisquamifolia Brehmer, endemic
 Wahlenbergia lycopodioides Schltr. & Brehmer, indigenous
 Wahlenbergia macra Schltr. & Brehmer, accepted as Wahlenbergia ecklonii H.Buek, present
 Wahlenbergia macrostachys (A.DC.) Lammers, endemic
 Wahlenbergia maculata Brehmer, endemic
 Wahlenbergia madagascariensis A.DC. indigenous
 Wahlenbergia magaliesbergensis Lammers, endemic
 Wahlenbergia massonii A.DC. endemic
 Wahlenbergia melanops Goldblatt & J.C.Manning, endemic
 Wahlenbergia meyeri A.DC. endemic
 Wahlenbergia microphylla (Adamson) Lammers, endemic
 Wahlenbergia minuta Brehmer, endemic
 Wahlenbergia mollis Brehmer, endemic
 Wahlenbergia namaquana Sond. endemic
 Wahlenbergia nana Brehmer, indigenous
 Wahlenbergia neorigida Lammers, endemic
 Wahlenbergia neostricta Lammers, endemic
 Wahlenbergia nodosa (H.Buek) Lammers, endemic
 Wahlenbergia obovata Brehmer, endemic
 Wahlenbergia oligantha Lammers, endemic
 Wahlenbergia oligotricha Schltr. & Brehmer, endemic
 Wahlenbergia oocarpa Sond. endemic
 Wahlenbergia orae Lammers, endemic
 Wahlenbergia oxyphylla A.DC. indigenous
 Wahlenbergia pallidiflora Hilliard & B.L.Burtt, endemic
 Wahlenbergia paniculata (Thunb.) A.DC. indigenous
 Wahlenbergia parvifolia (P.J.Bergius) Lammers, endemic
 Wahlenbergia patula A.DC. indigenous
 Wahlenbergia paucidentata Schinz, indigenous
 Wahlenbergia pauciflora A.DC. endemic
 Wahlenbergia pilosa H.Buek [1], endemic
 Wahlenbergia pinifolia N.E.Br. endemic
 Wahlenbergia pinnata Compton, indigenous
 Wahlenbergia polyantha Lammers, endemic
 Wahlenbergia polychotoma Brehmer, accepted as Wahlenbergia undulata (L.f.) A.DC. present
 Wahlenbergia polyclada A.DC. endemic
 Wahlenbergia polytrichifolia Schltr. indigenous
 Wahlenbergia polytrichifolia Schltr. subsp. dracomontana Hilliard & B.L.Burtt, indigenous
 Wahlenbergia polytrichifolia Schltr. subsp. polytrichifolia, endemic
 Wahlenbergia procumbens (Thunb.) A.DC. endemic
 Wahlenbergia prostrata A.DC. indigenous
 Wahlenbergia psammophila Schltr. indigenous
 Wahlenbergia pseudoandrosacea Brehmer, endemic
 Wahlenbergia pseudoinhambanensis Brehmer, endemic
 Wahlenbergia pseudonudicaulis Brehmer, endemic
 Wahlenbergia pulvillus-gigantis Hilliard & B.L.Burtt, indigenous
 Wahlenbergia pyrophila Lammers, endemic
 Wahlenbergia ramifera Brehmer, endemic
 Wahlenbergia ramulosa E.Mey. accepted as Wahlenbergia debilis H.Buek, endemic
 Wahlenbergia rara Schltr. & Brehmer, endemic
 Wahlenbergia rhytidosperma Thulin, endemic
 Wahlenbergia rigida Bernh. accepted as Theilera robusta (A.DC.) Cupido, present
 Wahlenbergia riversdalensis Lammers, endemic
 Wahlenbergia rivularis Diels, endemic
 Wahlenbergia robusta (A.DC.) Sond. accepted as Theilera robusta (A.DC.) Cupido, endemic
 Wahlenbergia roelliflora Schltr. & Brehmer, endemic
 Wahlenbergia rotundifolia Brehmer, accepted as Wahlenbergia brehmeri Lammers, present
 Wahlenbergia rubens (H.Buek) Lammers, endemic
 Wahlenbergia rubens (H.Buek) Lammers var. brachyphylla (Adamson) W.G.Welman, endemic
 Wahlenbergia rubens (H.Buek) Lammers var. rubens, endemic
 Wahlenbergia rubioides (Banks ex A.DC.) Lammers, endemic
 Wahlenbergia rubioides (Banks ex A.DC.) Lammers var. rubioides, endemic
 Wahlenbergia rubioides (Banks ex A.DC.) Lammers var. stokoei (Adamson) W.G.Welman, endemic
 Wahlenbergia saxifragoides Brehmer, endemic
 Wahlenbergia schistacea Brehmer, endemic
 Wahlenbergia schlechteri Brehmer, endemic
 Wahlenbergia scopella Brehmer, endemic
 Wahlenbergia serpentina Brehmer, endemic
 Wahlenbergia sessiliflora Brehmer, endemic
 Wahlenbergia sonderi Lammers, endemic
 Wahlenbergia sphaerica Brehmer, endemic
 Wahlenbergia squamifolia Brehmer, indigenous
 Wahlenbergia squarrosa Brehmer, endemic
 Wahlenbergia stellarioides Cham. & Schltdl. endemic
 Wahlenbergia subfusiformis Brehmer, endemic
 Wahlenbergia subpilosa Brehmer, endemic
 Wahlenbergia subrosulata Brehmer, indigenous
 Wahlenbergia subtilis Brehmer, endemic
 Wahlenbergia subulata (L'Her.) Lammers, endemic
 Wahlenbergia subulata (L'Her.) Lammers var. congesta (Adamson) W.G.Welman, endemic
 Wahlenbergia subulata (L'Her.) Lammers var. subulata, endemic
 Wahlenbergia subulata (L'Her.) Lammers var. tenuifolia (Adamson) W.G.Welman, endemic
 Wahlenbergia subumbellata Markgr. indigenous
 Wahlenbergia suffruticosa Cupido, indigenous
 Wahlenbergia swellendamensis H.Buek, accepted as Wahlenbergia ecklonii H.Buek, present
 Wahlenbergia tenella (L.f.) Lammers, endemic
 Wahlenbergia tenella (L.f.) Lammers var. palustris (Adamson) W.G.Welman, endemic
 Wahlenbergia tenella (L.f.) Lammers var. stokoei (Adamson) W.G.Welman, endemic
 Wahlenbergia tenella (L.f.) Lammers var. tenella, endemic
 Wahlenbergia tenerrima (H.Buek) Lammers, endemic
 Wahlenbergia tenerrima (H.Buek) Lammers var. montana (Adamson) W.G.Welman, endemic
 Wahlenbergia tenerrima (H.Buek) Lammers var. tenerrima, endemic
 Wahlenbergia tenuis A.DC. indigenous
 Wahlenbergia tetramera Thulin, endemic
 Wahlenbergia thulinii Lammers, endemic
 Wahlenbergia thunbergiana (H.Buek) Lammers, indigenous
 Wahlenbergia thunbergii (Schult.) B.Nord. indigenous
 Wahlenbergia thunbergii (Schult.) B.Nord. var. debilis (Sond.) B.Nord. endemic
 Wahlenbergia thunbergii (Schult.) B.Nord. var. filifolia (Adamson) B.Nord. endemic
 Wahlenbergia thunbergii (Schult.) B.Nord. var. thunbergii, endemic
 Wahlenbergia tomentosula Brehmer, endemic
 Wahlenbergia tortilis Brehmer, endemic
 Wahlenbergia transvaalensis Brehmer, endemic
 Wahlenbergia tumida Brehmer, endemic
 Wahlenbergia uitenhagensis (H.Buek) Lammers, accepted as Wahlenbergia thunbergii (Schult.) B.Nord. var. thunbergii, endemic
 Wahlenbergia uitenhagensis (H.Buek) Lammers var. debilis (Sond.) W.G.Welman, accepted as Wahlenbergia thunbergii (Schult.) B.Nord. var. debilis (Sond.) B.Nord. endemic
 Wahlenbergia uitenhagensis (H.Buek) Lammers var. filifolia (Adamson) W.G.Welman, accepted as Wahlenbergia thunbergii (Schult.) B.Nord. var. filifolia (Adamson) B.Nord. endemic
 Wahlenbergia umbellata (Adamson) Lammers, endemic
 Wahlenbergia undulata (L.f.) A.DC. indigenous
 Wahlenbergia unidentata (L.f.) Lammers, endemic
 Wahlenbergia virgata Engl. indigenous
 Wahlenbergia virgulta Brehmer, endemic
 Wahlenbergia wyleyana Sond. endemic

Goodeniaceae
Family: Goodeniaceae,

Genus Scaevola:
 Scaevola plumieri (L.) Vahl, indigenous
 Scaevola sericea Vahl, indigenous

Lobeliaceae
Family: Lobeliaceae,

Cyphia
Genus Cyphia:
 Cyphia alba N.E.Br. indigenous
 Cyphia alicedalensis E.Wimm. endemic
 Cyphia angustifolia C.Presl ex Eckl. & Zeyh. endemic
 Cyphia angustiloba C.Presl ex Eckl. & Zeyh. endemic
 Cyphia aspergilloides E.Wimm. indigenous
 Cyphia aspergilloides E.Wimm. var. aspergilloides, endemic
 Cyphia aspergilloides E.Wimm. var. brevipes E.Wimm. endemic
 Cyphia assimilis Sond. endemic
 Cyphia assimilis Sond. var. latifolia E.Phillips, accepted as Cyphia phillipsii E.Wimm. present
 Cyphia basiloba E.Wimm. endemic
 Cyphia belfastica E.Wimm. endemic
 Cyphia bolusii E.Phillips, indigenous
 Cyphia bulbosa (L.) P.J.Bergius, indigenous
 Cyphia bulbosa (L.) P.J.Bergius var. acocksii E.Wimm. endemic
 Cyphia bulbosa (L.) P.J.Bergius var. bulbosa, endemic
 Cyphia bulbosa (L.) P.J.Bergius var. hafstroemii E.Wimm. endemic
 Cyphia bulbosa (L.) P.J.Bergius var. leiandra E.Wimm. endemic
 Cyphia bulbosa (L.) P.J.Bergius var. orientalis E.Phillips, accepted as Cyphia linarioides C.Presl ex Eckl. & Zeyh. present
 Cyphia campestris Eckl. & Zeyh. ex C.Presl, indigenous
 Cyphia campestris Eckl. & Zeyh. ex C.Presl var. campestris, endemic
 Cyphia campestris Eckl. & Zeyh. ex C.Presl var. nudiuscula E.Wimm. endemic
 Cyphia comptonii Bond, endemic
 Cyphia corylifolia Harv. endemic
 Cyphia crenata (Thunb.) C.Presl, indigenous
 Cyphia crenata (Thunb.) C.Presl var. angustifolia E.Wimm. endemic
 Cyphia crenata (Thunb.) C.Presl var. crenata, endemic
 Cyphia deltoidea E.Wimm. endemic
 Cyphia dentariifolia C.Presl, indigenous
 Cyphia dentariifolia C.Presl var. dentariifolia, indigenous
 Cyphia dentariifolia C.Presl var. luttigii E.Wimm. endemic
 Cyphia dentariifolia C.Presl var. psilandra E.Wimm. endemic
 Cyphia dentata E.Wimm. endemic
 Cyphia digitata (Thunb.) Willd. indigenous
 Cyphia digitata (Thunb.) Willd. subsp. digitata, endemic
 Cyphia digitata (Thunb.) Willd. subsp. gracilis E.Wimm. endemic
 Cyphia eckloniana C.Presl ex Eckl. & Zeyh. endemic
 Cyphia elata Harv. indigenous
 Cyphia elata Harv. var. elata, indigenous
 Cyphia elata Harv. var. gerrardii (Harv.) E.Wimm. indigenous
 Cyphia elata Harv. var. glabra Harv. endemic
 Cyphia elata Harv. var. globularis E.Wimm. endemic
 Cyphia elata Harv. var. oblongifolia (Sond. & Harv.) E.Phillips, accepted as Cyphia oblongifolia Sond. & Harv. present
 Cyphia galpinii E.Wimm. endemic
 Cyphia georgica E.Wimm. endemic
 Cyphia glabra E.Wimm. endemic
 Cyphia heterophylla C.Presl ex Eckl. & Zeyh. endemic
 Cyphia incisa (Thunb.) Willd. indigenous
 Cyphia incisa (Thunb.) Willd. var. bracteata E.Phillips, endemic
 Cyphia incisa (Thunb.) Willd. var. cardamines (Thunb.) E.Phillips, endemic
 Cyphia incisa (Thunb.) Willd. var. incisa, endemic
 Cyphia incisa (Thunb.) Willd. var. lyrata E.Wimm. endemic
 Cyphia incisa (Thunb.) Willd. var. sinuata E.Wimm. endemic
 Cyphia latipetala C.Presl, endemic
 Cyphia linarioides C.Presl ex Eckl. & Zeyh. endemic
 Cyphia longiflora Schltr. endemic
 Cyphia longifolia N.E.Br. endemic
 Cyphia longifolia N.E.Br. var. baurii E.Phillips, accepted as Cyphia longifolia N.E.Br. present
 Cyphia longilobata E.Phillips, endemic
 Cyphia longipedicellata E.Wimm. endemic
 Cyphia longipetala C.Presl, endemic
 Cyphia maculosa E.Phillips, endemic
 Cyphia natalensis E.Phillips, endemic
 Cyphia oblongifolia Sond. & Harv. indigenous
 Cyphia oligotricha Schltr. endemic
 Cyphia persicifolia C.Presl, endemic
 Cyphia phillipsii E.Wimm. endemic
 Cyphia phyteuma (L.) Willd. indigenous
 Cyphia phyteuma (L.) Willd. var. ciliata E.Wimm. endemic
 Cyphia phyteuma (L.) Willd. var. grandidentata E.Wimm. endemic
 Cyphia phyteuma (L.) Willd. var. phyteuma, endemic
 Cyphia polydactyla C.Presl, endemic
 Cyphia psilostemon E.Wimm. endemic
 Cyphia ramosa E.Wimm. indigenous
 Cyphia ranunculifolia E.Wimm. endemic
 Cyphia revoluta E.Wimm. endemic
 Cyphia rogersii S.Moore, indigenous
 Cyphia rogersii S.Moore subsp. rogersii, indigenous
 Cyphia rogersii S.Moore subsp. winteri E.Wimm. endemic
 Cyphia salteri E.Wimm. endemic
 Cyphia schlechteri E.Phillips, endemic
 Cyphia smutsii E.Wimm. endemic
 Cyphia stenodonta E.Wimm. endemic
 Cyphia stenopetala Diels, indigenous
 Cyphia stenophylla E.Wimm. indigenous
 Cyphia subtubulata E.Wimm. endemic
 Cyphia sylvatica Eckl. indigenous
 Cyphia sylvatica Eckl. var. graminea E.Wimm. endemic
 Cyphia sylvatica Eckl. var. salicifolia (C.Presl ex Eckl. & Zeyh.) E.Wimm. endemic
 Cyphia sylvatica Eckl. var. sylvatica, endemic
 Cyphia tenera Diels, endemic
 Cyphia tortilis N.E.Br. endemic
 Cyphia transvaalensis E.Phillips, endemic
 Cyphia tricuspis E.Wimm. endemic
 Cyphia triphylla E.Phillips, indigenous
 Cyphia tysonii E.Phillips, endemic
 Cyphia undulata Eckl. endemic
 Cyphia volubilis (Burm.f.) Willd. indigenous
 Cyphia volubilis (Burm.f.) Willd. var. banksiana E.Wimm. endemic
 Cyphia volubilis (Burm.f.) Willd. var. intermedia E.Wimm. accepted as Cyphia longipetala C.Presl, present
 Cyphia volubilis (Burm.f.) Willd. var. latipetala (C.Presl ex Eckl. & Zeyh.) E.Wimm. accepted as Cyphia latipetala C.Presl, present
 Cyphia volubilis (Burm.f.) Willd. var. longipes E.Wimm. accepted as Cyphia angustiloba C.Presl ex Eckl. & Zeyh. present
 Cyphia volubilis (Burm.f.) Willd. var. volubilis, endemic
 Cyphia zeyheriana C.Presl ex Eckl. & Zeyh. endemic

Grammatotheca
Genus Grammatotheca:
 Grammatotheca bergiana (Cham.) C.Presl, indigenous
 Grammatotheca bergiana (Cham.) C.Presl var. bergiana, endemic
 Grammatotheca bergiana (Cham.) C.Presl var. ekloniana (C.Presl) E.Wimm. endemic
 Grammatotheca bergiana (Cham.) C.Presl var. foliosa E.Wimm. endemic
 Grammatotheca bergiana (Cham.) C.Presl var. pedunculata E.Wimm. endemic

Laurentia
Genus Laurentia:
 Laurentia arabidea (C.Presl) A.DC. accepted as Wimmerella arabidea (C.Presl) Serra, M.B.Crespo & Lammers, present
 Laurentia bifida (Thunb.) Sond. accepted as Wimmerella bifida (Thunb.) Serra, M.B.Crespo & Lammers, present
 Laurentia frontidentata E.Wimm. accepted as Wimmerella frontidentata (E.Wimm.) Serra, M.B.Crespo & Lammers, present
 Laurentia giftbergensis (E.Phillips) E.Wimm. accepted as Wimmerella bifida (Thunb.) Serra, M.B.Crespo & Lammers, present
 Laurentia hederacea Sond. accepted as Wimmerella hederacea (Sond.) Serra, M.B.Crespo & Lammers, present
 Laurentia hedyotidea Schltr. accepted as Wimmerella hedyotidea (Schltr.) Serra, M.B.Crespo & Lammers, present
 Laurentia longitubus E.Wimm. accepted as Wimmerella longitubus (E.Wimm.) Serra, M.B.Crespo & Lammers, present
 Laurentia mariae E.Wimm. accepted as Wimmerella mariae (E.Wimm.) Serra, M.B.Crespo & Lammers, present
 Laurentia pygmaea (Thunb.) Sond. var. pygmaea, accepted as Wimmerella pygmaea (Thunb.) Serra, M.B.Crespo & Lammers, present
 Laurentia secunda (L.f.) Kuntze, accepted as Wimmerella secunda (L.f.) Serra, M.B.Crespo & Lammers, present

Lobelia
Genus Lobelia:
 Lobelia acutangula (C.Presl) A.DC. accepted as Lobelia flaccida (C.Presl) A.DC. subsp. flaccida, present
 Lobelia anceps L.f. endemic
 Lobelia angolensis Engl. & Diels, accepted as Lobelia sonderiana (Kuntze) Lammers, present
 Lobelia aquaemontis E.Wimm. endemic
 Lobelia ardisiandroides Schltr. endemic
 Lobelia barkerae E.Wimm. endemic
 Lobelia bicolor Sims, accepted as Lobelia erinus L. present
 Lobelia boivinii Sond. endemic
 Lobelia caerulea Hook. var. caerulea, accepted as Lobelia tomentosa L.f. present
 Lobelia caerulea Hook. var. macularis (C.Presl) E.Wimm. accepted as Lobelia tomentosa L.f. present
 Lobelia capensis E.Wimm. accepted as Lobelia limosa (Adamson) E.Wimm. present
 Lobelia capillifolia (C.Presl) A.DC. endemic
 Lobelia chamaedryfolia (C.Presl) A.DC. endemic
 Lobelia chamaepitys Lam. indigenous
 Lobelia chamaepitys Lam. var. ceratophylla (C.Presl) E.Wimm. endemic
 Lobelia chamaepitys Lam. var. chamaepitys, endemic
 Lobelia chinensis Lour. not indigenous
 Lobelia cinerea Thunb. accepted as Wahlenbergia albicaulis (Sond.) Lammers, indigenous
 Lobelia cochlearifolia Diels, endemic
 Lobelia comosa L. indigenous
 Lobelia comosa L. var. comosa, endemic
 Lobelia comosa L. var. foliosa E.Wimm. endemic
 Lobelia comosa L. var. microdon (C.Presl) E.Wimm. endemic
 Lobelia comosa L. var. secundata (Sond.) E.Wimm. endemic
 Lobelia comptonii E.Wimm. endemic
 Lobelia corniculata Thulin, indigenous
 Lobelia coronopifolia L. endemic
 Lobelia cuneifolia Link & Otto, indigenous
 Lobelia cuneifolia Link & Otto var. ananda E.Wimm. endemic
 Lobelia cuneifolia Link & Otto var. cuneifolia, endemic
 Lobelia cuneifolia Link & Otto var. hirsuta (C.Presl) E.Wimm. endemic
 Lobelia cyphioides Harv. endemic
 Lobelia dasyphylla E.Wimm. endemic
 Lobelia decurrentifolia (Kuntze) K.Schum. endemic
 Lobelia dichroma Schltr. endemic
 Lobelia dodiana E.Wimm. var. dodiana, accepted as Lobelia quadrisepala (R.D.Good) E.Wimm. present
 Lobelia dodiana E.Wimm. var. radicans (Schonland) E.Wimm. accepted as Lobelia zwartkopensis E.Wimm. present
 Lobelia dregeana (C.Presl) A.DC. indigenous
 Lobelia eckloniana (C.Presl) A.DC. endemic
 Lobelia erinus L. indigenous
 Lobelia esterhuyseniae E.Wimm. accepted as Lobelia comptonii E.Wimm. present
 Lobelia eurypoda E.Wimm. indigenous
 Lobelia eurypoda E.Wimm. var. eurypoda, indigenous
 Lobelia eurypoda E.Wimm. var. fissurarum E.Wimm. endemic
 Lobelia flaccida (C.Presl) A.DC. indigenous
 Lobelia flaccida (C.Presl) A.DC. subsp. flaccida, indigenous
 Lobelia flaccida (C.Presl) A.DC. subsp. mossiana (R.D.Good) Thulin, indigenous
 Lobelia galpinii Schltr. indigenous
 Lobelia goetzei Diels, indigenous
 Lobelia hypsibata E.Wimm. endemic
 Lobelia jasionoides (A.DC.) E.Wimm. indigenous
 Lobelia jasionoides (A.DC.) E.Wimm. var. jasionoides, endemic
 Lobelia jasionoides (A.DC.) E.Wimm. var. sparsiflora (Sond.) E.Wimm. endemic
 Lobelia laurentioides Schltr. endemic
 Lobelia laxa MacOwan, indigenous
 Lobelia limosa (Adamson) E.Wimm. endemic
 Lobelia linarioides (C.Presl) A.DC. accepted as Lobelia flaccida (C.Presl) A.DC. subsp. flaccida, present
 Lobelia linearis Thunb. endemic
 Lobelia lobata E.Wimm. indigenous
 Lobelia malowensis E.Wimm. indigenous
 Lobelia montaguensis E.Wimm. accepted as Lobelia erinus L. present
 Lobelia muscoides Cham. endemic
 Lobelia neglecta Roem. & Schult. endemic
 Lobelia nugax E.Wimm. endemic
 Lobelia oranjensis E.Wimm. accepted as Lobelia erinus L. present
 Lobelia oreas E.Wimm. accepted as Lobelia flaccida (C.Presl) A.DC. subsp. flaccida, present
 Lobelia parvifolia P.J.Bergius, accepted as Wahlenbergia parvifolia (P.J.Bergius) Lammers, endemic
 Lobelia parvisepala E.Wimm. accepted as Lobelia erinus L. present
 Lobelia patula L.f. endemic
 Lobelia pentheri E.Wimm. accepted as Lobelia flaccida (C.Presl) A.DC. subsp. flaccida, present
 Lobelia pinifolia L. endemic
 Lobelia pinifolia L. var. laricina E.Wimm. accepted as Lobelia tomentosa L.f. present
 Lobelia preslii A.DC. indigenous
 Lobelia pteropoda (C.Presl) A.DC. endemic
 Lobelia pubescens Dryand. ex Aiton, indigenous
 Lobelia pubescens Dryand. ex Aiton var. holopsida E.Wimm. endemic
 Lobelia pubescens Dryand. ex Aiton var. incisa (C.Presl) Sond. endemic
 Lobelia pubescens Dryand. ex Aiton var. jaquiniana Sond. endemic
 Lobelia pubescens Dryand. ex Aiton var. pubescens, endemic
 Lobelia pubescens Dryand. ex Aiton var. rotundifolia E.Wimm. endemic
 Lobelia quadrisepala (R.D.Good) E.Wimm. endemic
 Lobelia reinekeana E.Wimm. accepted as Lobelia flaccida (C.Presl) A.DC. subsp. flaccida, present
 Lobelia setacea Thunb. indigenous
 Lobelia setacea Thunb. var. dissectifolia E.Wimm. endemic
 Lobelia setacea Thunb. var. setacea, endemic
 Lobelia sonderiana (Kuntze) Lammers, indigenous
 Lobelia stenosiphon (Adamson) E.Wimm. endemic
 Lobelia sutherlandii E.Wimm. accepted as Lobelia flaccida (C.Presl) A.DC. subsp. flaccida, present
 Lobelia thermalis Thunb. indigenous
 Lobelia tomentosa L.f. indigenous
 Lobelia trullifolia Hemsl. indigenous
 Lobelia trullifolia Hemsl. subsp. delicatula (Compton) Thulin, indigenous
 Lobelia valida L.Bolus, endemic
 Lobelia vanreenensis (Kuntze) K.Schum. indigenous
 Lobelia wilmsiana Diels, accepted as Lobelia flaccida (C.Presl) A.DC. subsp. flaccida, present
 Lobelia zwartkopensis E.Wimm. endemic

Monopsis
Genus Monopsis:
 Monopsis acrodon E.Wimm. endemic
 Monopsis alba Phillipson, endemic
 Monopsis belliflora E.Wimm. endemic
 Monopsis debilis (L.f.) C.Presl, indigenous
 Monopsis debilis (L.f.) C.Presl var. debilis, endemic
 Monopsis debilis (L.f.) C.Presl var. depressa (L.f.) Phillipson, endemic
 Monopsis debilis (L.f.) C.Presl var. gracilis (C.Presl) Phillipson, endemic
 Monopsis decipiens (Sond.) Thulin, indigenous
 Monopsis flava (C.Presl ex Eckl. & Zeyh.) E.Wimm. endemic
 Monopsis kowynensis E.Wimm. endemic
 Monopsis lutea (L.) Urb. endemic
 Monopsis scabra (Thunb.) Urb. endemic
 Monopsis simplex (L.) E.Wimm. endemic
 Monopsis stellarioides (C.Presl) Urb. indigenous
 Monopsis stellarioides (C.Presl) Urb. subsp. stellarioides, indigenous
 Monopsis unidentata (Dryand.) E.Wimm. indigenous
 Monopsis unidentata (Dryand.) E.Wimm. subsp. intermedia Phillipson, endemic
 Monopsis unidentata (Dryand.) E.Wimm. subsp. laevicaulis (C.Presl) Phillipson, endemic
 Monopsis unidentata (Dryand.) E.Wimm. subsp. unidentata, endemic
 Monopsis variifolia (Sims) Urb. endemic
 Monopsis zeyheri (Sond.) Thulin, indigenous

Unigenes
Genus Unigenes:
 Unigenes humifusa A.DC. endemic

Wimmerella
Genus Wimmerella:
 Wimmerella arabidea (C.Presl) Serra, M.B.Crespo & Lammers, indigenous
 Wimmerella bifida (Thunb.) Serra, M.B.Crespo & Lammers, endemic
 Wimmerella frontidentata (E.Wimm.) Serra, M.B.Crespo & Lammers, endemic
 Wimmerella giftbergensis (E.Phillips) Serra, M.B.Crespo & Lammers, accepted as Wimmerella bifida (Thunb.) Serra, M.B.Crespo & Lammers, present
 Wimmerella hederacea (Sond.) Serra, M.B.Crespo & Lammers, endemic
 Wimmerella hedyotidea (Schltr.) Serra, M.B.Crespo & Lammers, endemic
 Wimmerella longitubus (E.Wimm.) Serra, M.B.Crespo & Lammers, endemic
 Wimmerella mariae (E.Wimm.) Serra, M.B.Crespo & Lammers, endemic
 Wimmerella pygmaea (Thunb.) Serra, M.B.Crespo & Lammers, endemic
 Wimmerella secunda (L.f.) Serra, M.B.Crespo & Lammers, endemic

Menyanthaceae
Family: Menyanthaceae,

Nymphoides
Genus Nymphoides:
 Nymphoides forbesiana (Griseb.) Kuntze, indigenous
 Nymphoides indica (L.) Kuntze, indigenous
 Nymphoides indica (L.) Kuntze subsp. occidentalis A.Raynal, indigenous
 Nymphoides peltata (S.G.Gmel.) Kuntze, not indigenous, invasive
 Nymphoides rautanenii (N.E.Br.) A.Raynal, indigenous
 Nymphoides thunbergiana (Griseb.) Kuntze, indigenous

Villarsia
Genus Villarsia
 Villarsia capensis (Houtt.) Merr. endemic
 Villarsia goldblattiana Ornduff, endemic
 Villarsia manningiana Ornduff, endemic

References

South African plant biodiversity lists
Asterales